Writam Porel (born 29 August 1989) is an Indian first-class cricketer who plays for Bengal.

References

External links
 

1989 births
Living people
Indian cricketers
Bengal cricketers
Cricketers from Kolkata